Ludres is a commune in the Meurthe-et-Moselle département in north-eastern France.

The inhabitants are called Ludréens. In the past, inhabitants of Ludres were known by their neighbours as rôtisseurs ("roast meat sellers"), having once turned out en masse to watch their adulterous priest burned at the stake.

Population

Twin towns
Ludres is twinned with:

  Furth im Wald, Germany
  Furth bei Göttweig, Austria
  Domažlice, Czech Republic

See also
 Communes of the Meurthe-et-Moselle department

References

External links

 Official Ludres website

Communes of Meurthe-et-Moselle